Gerard Valck (30 September 1652 – 21 October 1726) was a Dutch engraver, publisher and cartographer.

Biography
Valck was born in Amsterdam on 30 September 1652 to an Amsterdam silversmith. He was a student of Abraham Blooteling and later married Blooteling's sister. He went to London with Blooteling in 1672 and may have remained there until 1680. Valck engraved many portraits of English nobility and worked frequently with Blooteling. His earliest dated mezzotint is titled Sleeping Cupid and was published in 1677. He based many of his engravings and mezzotints after designs by other artists like Peter Lely, Gérard de Lairesse and Philip Tideman. He published most of his works himself. In Amsterdam, he had a close partnership with his son Leonardus Valck and Peter Schenk the Elder, who married Gerard's sister in 1687. Valck also published atlases, maps, printed globes and prints of other things. He died in Amsterdam on 21 October 1726.

Gallery

References

External links

1652 births
1726 deaths
17th-century engravers
18th-century engravers
Engravers from Amsterdam
Dutch publishers (people)
Dutch cartographers